Al-Arab was a short-lived Arabic-language news channel which vowed to practice objective journalism. It was launched on 1 February 2015 and almost immediately shut down. The channel was owned by Saudi prince and entrepreneur Al-Waleed bin Talal, and was based in Manama, Bahrain.

Creation
In July 2010, Prince Al-Waleed, owner of a stake in News Corporation, planned to collaborate with News Corp to launch a 24-hour Arabic-language news channel. After a year of deliberation, Al-Waleed announced on 13 September 2011 the launch of Alarab as a personal private venture. He said the channel's editorial stance would be "inspired by the recent political events that have transformed the region, with particular attention to be paid to freedom of speech." The channel was supposedly entirely privately funded, with Al-Waleed insisting that it would not receive instructions from the Saudi government. At the time of the launch, no mention was made of News Corp's involvement.

In December 2011, Manama, Bahrain, was chosen as the network's headquarters. Doha, Dubai, Abu Dhabi and Beirut were also among the cities considered to host the network. Prince Al-Waleed retained close ties with the Bahraini royal family while his Kingdom Holding Company maintains a presence in the country through indirect investments in the banking sector.

Al-Arab was launched on 1 February 2015.

Al-Arab's regional competitors were Qatari-owned Al Jazeera and Saudi-government-owned Al Arabiya, along with BSkyB's Sky News Arabia. In a January 2012 interview, Al-Waleed described Al Jazeera as the "masses channel" while implying that Al Arabiya is the "government channel" among the two main news channels in the Middle East. He stated his goal for Al-Arab to "takes the centre’s point of view" between the two networks.

Ownership and management
Al-Arab was privately owned by Prince Al-Waleed bin Talal, independent from Kingdom Holding Company and Rotana Group, two corporations controlled by the prince. It was headquartered in Manama's Media City complex. The channel was based outside Saudi Arabia as the country does not allow independent news channels to operate within its borders.

The channel's director was Jamal Khashoggi, former editor of Al Watan, a newspaper in Saudi Arabia. Khashoggi was removed as editor in 2010 after Al Watan published an article criticizing Salafism, the fundamentalist Islamic movement that is Saudi Arabia's official state religion.

The channel partners with US financial news channel Bloomberg Television, which would have provided five hours of daily programming, including financial bulletins, analysis, reports on regional business leaders, and global financial news. The partnership would have brought al-Arab into direct competition with Arabic-language financial news channel CNBC Arabiya.

Censorship and shutdown
On 1 February 2015, al-Arab's first day of programming included an interview with Bahraini Shi'a politician and former member of the Council of Representatives, Khalil al-Marzooq, who discussed the cancelling of 72 Bahrainis' citizenship. Broadcasting was suspended after the interview. Al-Arab stated that the suspension was for "technical and administrative reasons", while the newspaper Akhbar al-Khaleej attributed the suspension to al-Arab "not adhering to the norms prevalent in Gulf countries".

The shutdown of Al Arab TV was a result of the media censorship vigorously enforced by the ruling regime, where any criticism of the absolute monarchy or the mention of Shia majority oppression is not tolerated.

References

External links
 

2015 establishments in Bahrain
2015 disestablishments in Bahrain
24-hour television news channels
Arabic-language television stations
Arabic-language television
Censorship in Islam
Censorship in Bahrain
Defunct television channels
Mass media in Manama
Television channels and stations established in 2015
Television channels and stations disestablished in 2015
Defunct mass media in Bahrain